Sporting Clube de Portugal has a professional beach soccer team based in Lisbon, Portugal, since 2005, until 2006 and again in 2009 that plays in Portuguese Beach Soccer League.

Current squad

Coach:  Mário Miguel

Honours

International competitions
 Mundialito de Clubes
 Runners-up (1): 2011

National competitions
 Circuito Nacional de Futebol de Praia
 Winners (2): 2016, 2020
 Runners-up (3): 2011, 2014, 2015

 Portuguese Beach Soccer League
 Runners-up (2): 2005, 2006

References

External links
 Sporting beach soccer official website
 Sporting in zerozero.pt

Beach soccer in Portugal
Sporting CP sports
2005 establishments in Portugal
Association football clubs established in 2005
Beach soccer clubs